Demi the Demoness is a fictional, humorous, erotic comics character whose fantasy adventures have been published since 1992. Demi was created by SS Crompton. Demi has appeared in numerous comics crossovers with other characters, including Shaundra, Captain Fortune, Mauvette, Vampirooni, Cassiopeia the Witch, Djustine, Crimson Gash, and adult film stars Tracey Adams, Tabitha Stevens, Deja Sin, and Bonnie Michaels.

Over 35 different Demi the Demoness comics have been published. Numerous artists and authors have worked on Demi comics over the years, including Frank Brunner, Tim Vigil, Seppo Makinen, Philo, Ryan Vella, Gus Norman, Enrico Teodorani, Silvano, Diego Simone, Jay Allen Sanford, and many others. Demi has also been the subject of T-shirts, dice, a trading card set, a resin model kit, and a movie.

Publication history 
Demi the Demoness first appeared in Demi the Demoness #1 by Revolutionary Comics' Carnal Comics imprint in 1992. After the publisher, Todd Loren was murdered, the series moved to underground comic publisher Rip Off Press from 1993 to 1997, where eight more Demi comics were published, including a trade paperback collection and a choose-your-own-adventure book.

Demi was then published by Revisionary Press, the company that took over the Carnal Comics imprint. Revisionary published six more Demi titles from 1997 to 2000. Demi's ribald adventures were also published in full-color in Oui magazine from 1996 to 1998.

Carnal spun off from Revisionary in 2000 and Demi has been published in more than a dozen more comics by Carnal since then. Demi has also appeared in comics published by Eros Comix, MU Press, Hippy Comix, and several smaller publishing ventures.

Demi stories have been translated into Swedish and Italian.

Character biography  
Raised in one of the few "sanctuaries" in Hell, the Rookery was a hidden, safe place to be compared to the more gruesome inner areas of Hell. Demi was raised there, so she never experienced the cruelty that almost all demons possess. Thus her personality is charming and naïve.

After a Demon army attacked the Rookery, Demi escaped and found the pyramid of Kit-Ra, a banished cat goddess. Kit-Ra took Demi in and she has lived there ever since. She regularly uses Kit-Ra's mystical transport mirrors to visit other worlds and times outside of Hell.

In other media 
A Demi the Demoness movie was released on DVD in May 2008. The film was co-written by SS Crompton and Steve Steele, and directed by Steele. The film stars Ellie Idol as Demi, Sinn Sage as Vampirooni, and Audrey Elson as Lyssa the Witch.

Bibliography 
 Demi the Demoness #1 (Revolutionary/Carnal, 1992)
 Demi the Demoness #2–4 (Rip Off Press, 1993–1997)
 Demi the Demoness #5 (Revisionary/Carnal, 1999)
 Demi the Demoness #6–7 (Carnal Comics, 2002–2004)
 Demi Adventure Special (Rip Off Press, 1995) 
 Demi: Erotic Saga Graphic Novel (Rip Off Press, 1996)
 Demi Saga of a Demoness (Carnal Comics, 2006)
 Pantheon #1–3 (Archer Books, 1995–1997)
 Demi Meets Cassiopeia #1 (Rip Off Press, 1997)
 Demi & Capt. Fortune #1 (Rip Off Press, 1997)
 Demi & Shaundra #1 (Rip Off Press, 1997)
 Demi's Wild Kingdom Adventure (Carnal/MU Press, 2000)
 Sex Squad #1–2 (Carnal Comics, 2003–2004)
 Demi & Vampirooni #1 (Carnal Comics, 2006)
 Demi Hardcore #1–3 (Eros Comix, 1999–2005)
 Demi's Strange Bedfellows #1–6 (Carnal Comics, 2001–2021)
 Carnal Comics: The Inside Story (Carnal Comics, 2004)
 Demi's Rear Entry #11 (Eros Comics, 2005)
 Demi's Pin-Up Diary (Carnal Comics, 2007)
 Demi the Demoness Movie (Carnal Comics/MSD, 2008)
 Demi meets the Crimson Gash (Carnal Comics, 2008)
 Girl meets Tentacle (Demi co-star) #1 (Carnal Comics, 2010)
 Demi & the Sex Squad Giant Size #1 (Carnal Comics, 2011)
 Roxy Ramjet One Day in Hell (Demi Cameo) #1 (3rd Nip, 2012)
 SS Crompton's Lost Comics #1 (Demi scene) (Raven Press, 2013)
 Demi vs the Monsters of the 3rd Reich #1 (Carnal Comics, 2014)
 Demi's Rarities #1 (Carnal Comics, 2018)
 Cthulu Crisis #1 (Raven Press, 2019)

 References 
 Don & Maggie Thompson, Comic Book Superstars, 1993, pg. 47
 Loren, Sanford, Crompton, Carnal Comics: The Inside Story of Art Sex & Porn Stars, 2004
 Brent Frankenhoff, The Standard Catalog of Comic Books, 2002, pg. 333
 Fogel's Underground Comix Price Guide, 2006
 Comic Buyers Guide #1621, pg. 87, 2006
 Demi: Saga of a Demoness, Vol. 1'', 2006

External links 
 Carnal Comics & Demi official website
 Demi the Demoness movie site
 Interview with SS Crompton, (re)Search my Trash, 2008

Comics characters introduced in 1992
Fictional demons and devils
Underground comix
Female characters in comics